Pathur may refer to the following places in India:

 Pathur, Medak, Telangana
 Pathur, Kasaragod, Kerala